PT2 or variant may refer to:
 New Horizons PT2 aka 2014 OS393
 Pratt & Whitney PT2 company designation for the Pratt & Whitney T34 turboprop aircraft engine
 PT-2, a pre-World War II US Navy PT-boat.
 Prison Tycoon 2: Maximum Security (2006 videogame)
 PT2 a paratriathlon classification,

See also
 Part Two (disambiguation)